Wojciech Fibak and Kim Warwick were the defending champions.

Seeds

Draw

Finals

Top half

Bottom half

External links
 1979 Australian Open – Men's draws and results at the International Tennis Federation

Men's Doubles
Australian Open (tennis) by year – Men's doubles